Dana Ptáčková (born 28 May 1952) is a Czech basketball player. She competed in the women's tournament at the 1976 Summer Olympics.

References

1952 births
Living people
Czech women's basketball players
Olympic basketball players of Czechoslovakia
Basketball players at the 1976 Summer Olympics
Sportspeople from Olomouc